Tate's Cairn Tunnel is a four-lane road tunnel in Hong Kong. Constructed as part of Route 2, it links Diamond Hill, New Kowloon with Siu Lek Yuen, Sha Tin, New Territories East. It opened on 26 June 1991.

Its toll plaza is situated on the Sha Tin side, leading to Tate's Cairn Highway, Sha Lek Highway and various local roads. The tunnel joins the Kwun Tong Bypass and is connected with Lung Cheung Road and Hammer Hill Road and several local roads on the Kowloon side.

History
Construction of the Tate's Cairn Tunnel, begun in July 1988, was carried out by a joint venture between Gammon Construction and Nishimatsu. Nishimatsu built the tunnel and the two ventilation buildings, while Gammon constructed the approach roads and buildings.

The tunnel opened to traffic at 8:00 pm on 26June 1991. It was reported that traffic in the Lion Rock Tunnel dropped 20 per cent during the Tate's Cairn Tunnel's first day of operation. The tunnel was formally inaugurated by Governor David Wilson on 1July that year.

Franchise model
The Tate's Cairn Tunnel is a BOT (build, operate, transfer) infrastructure project funded 100% by the private sector. The BOT franchise was awarded to the Tate's Cairn Tunnel Company Limited for a period of 30 years by the Hong Kong Government in 1988.

Under the terms of the BOT, the franchisee is responsible for the construction and operation of the tunnel until the end of the franchise period. During the franchise period, the company was allowed to earn a reasonable but not excessive return through the collection of tolls. The statutory requirements to the company were defined by the Tate's Cairn Tunnel Ordinance. Upon the expiration of franchise at midnight of 11July 2018, the tunnel is now transferred to the government.

Tunnel tolls
Tolls are collected manually or electronically in both directions at the toll plaza on the Sha Tin side.

Notes

Tunnel facilities
dual-tube, 4-laned
9 manual toll booths and 5 autotoll booth
24 cross passages 
160 fire alarms 
156 emergency telephones 
320 fire extinguishers 
82 hose reels 
78 hydrants 
18,268 fluorescent tubes 
3,277 tunnel wall panels 
44 CCTVs inside tunnel tubes 
10 CCTVs outside tunnel tubes 
16 ventilation fans

References

External links

 Tate's Cairn Tunnel Company
 Transport Department, toll rates
 

Diamond Hill
New Kowloon
Toll tunnels in Hong Kong
Siu Lek Yuen
China Resources
NWS Holdings
Tunnels completed in 1991
Route 2 (Hong Kong)
Road tunnels in Hong Kong
1991 establishments in Hong Kong